Söyüdlər (also, Sëyudlyar and Soyutlar) is a village and municipality in the Kurdamir Rayon of Azerbaijan.

References

External links

Populated places in Kurdamir District